The streak-backed oriole (Icterus pustulatus) is a medium-sized species of passerine bird from the icterid family (the same family as many blackbirds, meadowlarks, cowbirds, grackles, and others, including the New World orioles). It is native to Central America and Mexico and is an occasional visitor to the United States.

Distribution and habitat

It is native to Costa Rica, Nicaragua, Honduras, El Salvador, Guatemala, Mexico and an occasional visitor to the Southwestern United States.

Its natural habitat consists of woodland, savanna, grassland and shrubland. It prefers open arid woodland, typically with a strong presence of mimosa.

Subspecies 
The following subspecies are currently recognized:
Icterus pustulatus alticola W. Miller & Griscom, 1925
Icterus pustulatus dickermani A. R. Phillips, 1995
Icterus pustulatus graysonii Cassin, 1867
Icterus pustulatus interior A. R. Phillips, 1995
Icterus pustulatus maximus Griscom, 1930
Icterus pustulatus microstictus Griscom, 1934
Icterus pustulatus pustulatus (Wagler, 1829)
Icterus pustulatus pustuloides Van Rossem, 1927
Icterus pustulatus sclateri Cassin, 1867
Icterus pustulatus yaegeri A. R. Phillips, 1995

References

External links
Streak-backed oriole videos - Internet Bird Collection

streak-backed oriole
streak-backed oriole
Birds of Mexico
Birds of Central America
Birds of Guatemala
Birds of El Salvador
Birds of Honduras
Birds of Nicaragua
Birds of Costa Rica
streak-backed oriole